In botany, available space theory (also known as first available space theory) is a theory used to explain why most plants have an alternating leaf pattern on their stems. The theory states that the location of a new leaf on a stem is determined by the physical space between existing leaves. In other words, the location of a new leaf on a growing stem is directly related to the amount of space between the previous two leaves. Building on ideas first put forth by Hoffmeister in 1868, Snow and Snow hypothesized in 1947 that leaves sprouted in the first available space on the stem.

See also
Repulsion theory
Phyllotaxis

References

Botany